Alcobendas is a municipality of Spain located in the Community of Madrid.

It forms an urban continuum with the neighbouring municipality of San Sebastián de los Reyes. The affluent residential area of La Moraleja lies within the municipal limits, segregated from the main urban nucleus by the A-1 highway. The municipality features the Valdelatas nature reserve and a light industrial estate. It also houses a basketball museum organised by the Pedro Ferrándiz Foundation where the FIBA Hall of Fame is located.

Once a working class area, Alcobendas has become one of the most economically affluent municipalities in the Madrid metropolitan area.

History 
The settlement is first documented in a 1208 border delimitation between the lands of Segovia and Madrid. In 1369, the Castilian Crown gifted the village to the Mendozas, later passing to control of the Arias Dávila family. The population boomed after 1960.

Transport

Alcobendas lies within CRTM's B1 fare zone for passenger transport.

Both Alcobendas and its neighbour city, San Sebastián de los Reyes are connected with Madrid with buses operated by the 'Interbús' bus company. There are currently eight bus lines that go to and from different districts of Alcobendas to Plaza de Castilla (the hub for public transport to northern Madrid). Alcobendas also has eight bus lines that connect the different zones of Alcobendas between themselves.

Metro (Underground)

Alcobendas presently has four Metro stations (La Granja, La Moraleja, Marqués de la Valdavia and Manuel de Falla) which are all on line 10 of the Madrid Metro network. These stations were recently opened by Esperanza Aguirre, former President of the Autonomous Community of Madrid.

Buses

Buses going to and from Plaza de Castilla are:
151 Madrid (Pza. Castilla) - Alcobendas (FF.CC)
153 Madrid (Pza. Castilla) - Alcobendas (Rosa Luxemburgo)
153B a.k.a. B53 Madrid (Pinar de Chamartín) - Alcobendas (Rosa Luxemburgo)
155 Madrid (Pza. Castilla) - Alcobendas (El Soto de la Moraleja)
155B a.k.a. B55 Madrid (Pza. Castilla) - Alcobendas (El Encinar de los Reyes)
157 Madrid (Pza. Castilla) - Alcobendas (Pº de la Chopera)
157C a.k.a. C57 Madrid (Pza. Castilla) - Alcobendas (Valdelasfuentes)
159 Madrid (Pza. Castilla) - Alcobendas (Arroyo de la Vega)

Buses connecting different parts of Alcobendas are:
L-1 Arroyo de la Vega - El Soto de la Moraleja - La Moraleja
L-2 Alcobendas - La Moraleja [via Pº Alcobendas]
L-3 Arroyo de la Vega - El Soto de la Moraleja - El Encinar de los Reyes
L-5 San Sebastián de los Reyes - Alcobendas - El Soto de la Moraleja
L-6 Valdelasfuentes (FF.CC) - Polígono Industrial
L-9 Alcobendas (FF.CC) - Arroyo de la Vega

Two further circular lines are:
C10 Valdelasfuentes - Arroyo de la Vega - Valdelasfuentes
C11 Arroyo de la Vega - Valdelasfuentes - Arroyo de la Vega

Cercanías Train

Alcobendas also has two suburban railway stations (one shared with San Sebastián de los Reyes):
Valdelasfuentes and
Alcobendas-San Sebastián de los Reyes.
Both form part of the C-4a Cercanías line and can get to Sol and Atocha in half an hour.

Private transport

Alcobendas is also easily reached by car, but there are also a number of motorways going through and around Alcobendas. Airport access is perfect with the recently built motorway, the M-12, which connects the Canillejas district of Madrid with Barajas International Airport.

List of motorways and main roads that go through Alcobendas:
A-1-Autovía del Norte
R-2-Radial 2 (Madrid-Guadalajara)
M-50-Autopista M-50
M-12-Autopista Eje-Aeropuerto
M-603-Carretera de Fuencarral a Alcobendas
M-616-Carretera de El Pardo a Alcobendas

The difficulty of parking in Alcobendas varies depending on which district you are parking in. In the Casco district it is challenging to find a parking space. In the newer areas, however, due to the ample parking facilities, parking is not an issue.

Economy
Air Madrid used to have its head office in Alcobendas until the company folded in 2006.

Education

 Colegio Suizo de Madrid
 Brains International School
 International College Spain
 Kings College (Alcobendas campus)
 Protestant Faculty of Theology at Madrid (UEBE)
 Saint-Exupéry campus of the Lycée Français de Madrid
 Scandinavian School in Madrid
 Runnymede College

Sport

In 2010, Alcobendas was to be the host city of the 2010 CIRH Women's World Cup, the most important competition in Women's Roller Hockey.

Notable people
 Penélope Cruz, actress. During the 2009 Academy Awards ceremony, after being awarded Best Supporting Actress, she openly acknowledged the municipality in her acceptance speech.
 Marcos Pérez Jiménez, former Venezuelan dictator. Residence after being exiled from Venezuela where he lived until his death in 2001.
 American singer Bing Crosby died of a heart attack while on a golf course in Alcobendas in October 1977.
 Alfonso Calderon, activist, survivor of the Stoneman Douglas High School shooting

Climate
The Köppen Climate Classification subtype for this climate is "Csa 
" (Mediterranean Climate).

References

External links 

Alcobendas 

 
Municipalities in the Community of Madrid